Rubber Racketeers is a 1942 American crime film directed by Harold Young and starring Ricardo Cortez and Rochelle Hudson.

The film was inspired by tire rationing.

Plot summary 
Gilin is a gangster who has just gotten out of prison. One night while driving home with his girlfriend Nikki, he collides with defense worker Bill Barry and his fiancé Mary Dale. Bill's tires are destroyed.  When Gilin's insurance company is unable to replace them, Nikki convinces him to exchange Bill's car for the car of Gilin's Chinese servant Tom, who has enlisted in the Army.

With government restrictions on rubber in place due to the war, Gilin goes into business stealing and re-selling good tires, then sells tires retreaded with cheap synthetic rubber to used-car lots.

One of Gilin's retreads blows out and causes the death of Mary's brother. Bill and his co-workers become determined to find the culprit behind the shoddy tires. Gilin worries that his scheme will be discovered after Bill traces a tire to his lot.

Nikki is pressured by Gilin to make herself available to Bill in a friendly manner, in order to find out what he knows and what his plans might be. Nikki does meet with Bill, but pretends to Gilin that she could not reach him; she then secretly warns Mary about the gangster. Bill goes to see Nikki, intending to collect information from her about the entire tire scam, and falls into Gilin's trap.

Gilin knocks Bill out and plans to kill him. Tom, who is back visiting on leave from the army, refuses to help his old boss when he learns that Gilin is a war profiteer. Gilin shoots Tom and escapes with Nikki to his warehouse. Tom manages to stay alive long enough to tell a recovered Bill what has happened. Bill calls his co-workers and the police, and they raid the warehouse en masse. During the fight, Gilin is shot by one of his own men, who is appalled that Gilin would kill Tom, a soldier.

Nikki and Mary both land jobs at the armaments factory with Bill.

Cast 
Ricardo Cortez as Gilin
Rochelle Hudson as Nikki
William Henry as Bill Barry
Barbara Read as Mary Dale
John Abbott as Dumbo
Dick Rich as Mule
Dewey Robinson as Larkin
Sam Edwards as Freddy Dale
Kam Tong as Tom
Milburn Stone as Angel
Pat Gleason as Curley
Alex Callam as Butch
Alan Hale Jr. as Red
Dick Hogan as Bert
Marjorie Manners as Lila

Production
The film was originally called Hot Rubber. 20th Century Fox wanted to make a film with the same title. The case was put before the Association of Motion Picture Producers who ruled that whoever started the film first could use the title. Universal also announced plans to make a film on the same topic with Destiny.

Filming started in May. That month the filmmakers changed their title to Rubber Racketeers in May 1942.

Release
The Los Angeles Times said the film "drags somewhat in establishing the plot but reaches a striking climax of the melodramatic order."

Soundtrack

References

External links 

1942 films
1942 crime drama films
American black-and-white films
Monogram Pictures films
Films directed by Harold Young (director)
American crime drama films
1940s English-language films
1940s American films